R57 may refer to:
 R57 (South Africa), a road
 , a destroyer of the Royal Navy
 Mini Cabrio (R57), a car
 R57: Toxic to bees, a risk phrase